Otto Malm may refer to:

Otto Malm (businessman) (1838-1898), Finnish shipping magnate
Otto Malm (footballer) (1890-1969), Swedish footballer